Todd Atwater (born March 9, 1966) is an American politician who served in the South Carolina House of Representatives from the 87th district from 2010 to 2018.

In the 2018 South Carolina primary election, Atwater ran against Alan Wilson for the Republican nomination for Attorney General. Atwater finished second to Wilson, forcing a run-off election on June 26, 2018. In the run-off, Atwater lost to Wilson.

References

1966 births
Living people
Republican Party members of the South Carolina House of Representatives
Politicians from Greenville, South Carolina